Tropical Storm Harriet was a tropical cyclone that hit Thailand and East Pakistan in October 1962. It formed in the South China Sea before making landfall in Southern Thailand and crossing the Malay Peninsula into the Bay of Bengal. It caused extensive damage in Thailand, especially in the area of Laem Talumphuk, where it wiped out entire villages, caused over 900 fatalities and left over 10,000 people homeless, making it the deadliest storm in the history of Thailand.

Meteorological history 

The system that would become Tropical Storm Harriet formed off the western coast of the Philippines on the morning on the afternoon of October 19. The system proceeded northwest, then darted southwest off the coast, crossing through the South China Sea. The storm spent several days through the open ocean, unable to strengthen into a tropical depression. On October 23, the storm turned northward towards South Vietnam, but soon returned westward, slowly strengthening as it crossed the South China Sea. On the afternoon of October 25, the system finally strengthened into a tropical storm, receiving the name of Harriet. After crossing the country, Harriet weakened into a low on October 26 in the open waters of the Indian Ocean. The system continued westward, then curved to the northeast. It attained peak 1 minute winds of 120 km/h (75 mph) on October 30 while approaching the northeastern Bay of Bengal. Soon after, the cyclone made landfall near Chittagong in Bangladesh (then East Pakistan) before dissipating over Myanmar on October 31.

Impact 
Harriet caused extensive damage in the area of Laem Talumphuk in Pak Phanang District of Nakhon Si Thammarat Province, where it wiped out entire villages. Initial reports noted at least 769 fatalities, with 142 missing as of November 4, and over 252 severe injuries. Damage at the time was estimated to be over $34.5 million (1962 USD) to government buildings, agriculture, homes and fishing fleets. The disaster left 16,170 people homeless and destroyed 22,296 buildings across the province. Final figures by the Thai Meteorological Department record 935 deaths, making it the deadliest tropical cyclone in the country's history.

The cyclone killed 50,000 people in what is now Bangladesh.

See also 

 List of storms named Harriet
 Typhoon Gay (1989) – Another tropical cyclone that crossed Thailand

References 

1962 Pacific typhoon season
1962 North Indian Ocean cyclone season
Typhoons in Thailand
1962 in Thailand
Tropical cyclones in Bangladesh
Tropical cyclones in Myanmar
1962 in Burma
October 1962 events in Asia